Atiprimod (INN, codenamed SK&F106615) is a substance being studied in the treatment of certain multiple myelomas and other advanced cancers. It may block the growth of tumors and the growth of blood vessels from surrounding tissue to the tumor.  This drug is also being researched as a potential treatment for various autoimmune diseases.  It was first developed by GlaxoSmithKline as a potential treatment for rheumatoid arthritis. The substance is also known as azaspirane, although this more properly refers to the class of chemicals to which atiprimod belongs.

This compound has also been shown to kill mantle cell lymphoma cells in vitro.

Mechanism of action
Atiprimod has been shown to inhibit angiogenesis (growth of blood vessels) in a blood vessel model using chicken eggs. It is thought to inhibit the secretion of vascular endothelial growth factor (VEGF), a growth factor that promotes angiogenesis.

Chemistry
Atiprimod is an amphiphilic compound and a cation at neutral pH.

Synthesis

References

Further reading

External links
 Atiprimod entry in the public domain NCI Dictionary of Cancer Terms

Experimental cancer drugs
Pyrrolidines
Spiro compounds
Diethylamino compounds